Peter Sigvard Carlberg (born 8 December 1950) is a Swedish actor. He was educated at the Swedish National Academy of Mime and Acting.

Filmography

Feature films 
2012 - Call Girl
2011 - Avalon
2010 - Trust Me
2008 - Let the Right One In - Lacke
2004 - Bombay Dreams
2004 - Skjærsild

Short films
1992 - Den flygande norrlänningen - the father

TV series
2013 - Crimes of Passion
2007 - Beck - Det tause skriket
2007 - Höök - Janne Hall
2005 - God morgon alla barn – Kent

External links

Peter Carlberg at Svensk filmdatabas

1950 births
Living people
Swedish male actors
Best Supporting Actor Guldbagge Award winners